Broccostella is a comune (municipality) in the Province of Frosinone in the Italian region Lazio, located about  east of Rome and about  northeast of Frosinone.

Broccostella borders the following municipalities: Arpino, Campoli Appennino, Fontechiari, Posta Fibreno, Sora.

Lady Gaga's maternal great-grandparents Vincenzo Ferri and Filomena Campagna (Veronica Rose Bissett's parents) were both born in this comune when its name still was only Brocco.

Twin towns
 Navan, Ireland

References

Cities and towns in Lazio